Aruwin binti Salehhuddin (born February 14, 2004) is a Malaysian alpine ski racer.
She competed at the 2022 Winter Olympics in Beijing, China under the Malaysian flag alongside Jeffrey Webb, who is also competing in alpine skiing. Both of them were also the flagbearers for Malaysia. She is also the first female athlete to represent Malaysia at the Winter Olympics. In the giant slalom she finished 38th.

Olympic results

References

Living people
2004 births
Malaysian people of Malay descent
Olympic alpine skiers of Malaysia
Alpine skiers at the 2022 Winter Olympics
Malaysian female alpine skiers